Ofer Bar-Yosef (29 August 1937 – 14 March 2020) was an Israeli archaeologist and anthropologist whose main field of study was the Palaeolithic period.

From 1967 Bar-Yosef was Professor of Prehistoric Archaeology at Hebrew University in Jerusalem, the institution where he originally studied archaeology at undergraduate and post-graduate levels in the 1960s. In 1988, he moved to the United States of America where he became Professor of Prehistoric Archaeology at Harvard University as well as Curator of Palaeolithic Archaeology at the Peabody Museum of Archaeology and Ethnology. He was a professor emeritus.

He has excavated widely on prehistoric Levantine sites including Kebara Cave, the early Neolithic village of Netiv HaGdud, as well as on Palaeolithic and Neolithic sites in China and Georgia.

Selected publications

 The Natufian Culture in the Levant (Ed), International Monographs in Prehistory, 1992.
 Late Quaternary Chronology and Paleoclimates of the Eastern Mediterranean. Radiocarbon,  1994.
 Seasonality and Sedentism: Archaeological Perspectives from Old and New World Sites, (Ed), Peabody Museum of Archaeology and Ethnology, 1998.
 (with Belfer-Cohen, A) From Africa to Eurasia - Early Dispersals. Quaternary International 75:19-28, 2001.

See also 
 Nigel Goring-Morris
 Anna Belfer-Cohen

References

External links
Ofer Bar-Yosef at Harvard's website

1937 births
2020 deaths
Israeli archaeologists
Israeli anthropologists
Harvard University faculty
Foreign associates of the National Academy of Sciences
Prehistorians
Jewish anthropologists
Corresponding Fellows of the British Academy